Mariano Bernad Sanz (1838–1915) was an Aragonese priest, missionary and writer born in Calanda in the Spanish comarca of Bajo Aragón.

Selected works
Vocabulario Cuyono & Apuntes gramaticales
Preliminares

Bibliography
 García Miralles, Manuel (1969). Historia de Calanda. Valencia: Tipografía Artística Puertes.

External links
 Mariano Bernad in Epdlp (Spanish)
 La obra escrita de Mariano Bernad. Sobre el legado del misionero de Calanda ('Kolenda', Mayo 2013, nº 106) Escritos de José Antonio Bielsa (Spanish)

1838 births
1915 deaths
People from Calanda
Spanish Roman Catholic missionaries